Asiccia is a monotypic moth genus of the family Noctuidae. Its only species, Asiccia lithosiana, is found in India. Both the genus and species were first described by George Hampson in 1926.

References

Catocalinae
Monotypic moth genera